James Patrick "Flat" Walsh (March 23, 1897 — December 2, 1959) was a Canadian professional ice hockey goaltender. He played in the National Hockey League (NHL) for the Montreal Maroons and New York Americans between 1927 and 1933. Much of his career, which spanned 1915 through 1933, was spent in various minor leagues.

Biography
Walsh was one of the first back-up goaltenders in NHL history, as the Montreal Maroons kept him as a spare for the great Clint Benedict in case of injury. He played one game during the 1926–27 season and one game in 1927–28. In 1928–29, Roy Worters was suspended by NHL president Frank Calder for not reporting to the Pittsburgh Pirates. Worters was sold to the New York Americans, but the Pirates failed to inform Calder of these arrangements and Calder, on his dignity, refused to lift Worters' suspension. As a result, the Americans borrowed Walsh for a few games and he did quite well.

In 1929–30, after Clint Benedict broke his nose on a Howie Morenz shot, Walsh became the Maroons regular goaltender. The following year, James Strachan felt that Walsh could not handle the goaltending alone and Walsh shared the goaltending with Dave Kerr. In 1931–32, Walsh shared the goaltending chores with Normie Smith. Kerr was back to share the goaltending with Walsh in 1932–33, but Walsh came down with influenza which he suffered for a full two weeks and he decided to retire, which saddened Montreal fans, as he was popular with them.

After his retirement, Walsh served as assistant coach with the Maroons in 1934–35. He competed in curling in the 1940s. Walsh died in December 1959; he was survived by his wife and two children.

Career statistics

Regular season and playoffs

Sources

References

External links
 

1897 births
1959 deaths
Canadian ice hockey goaltenders
Detroit Greyhounds players
Ice hockey people from Ontario
Montreal Maroons players
New Haven Eagles players
New York Americans players
Ontario Hockey Association Senior A League (1890–1979) players
Quebec Castors players
Sportspeople from Kingston, Ontario
Canadian expatriate ice hockey players in the United States